Ancylometis paulianella is a species of moth in the  family Oecophoridae. It occurs on Réunion.

See also
 List of moths of Réunion

References

Moths described in 1957
Oecophoridae
Moths of Réunion
Endemic fauna of Réunion